First National Bank Building, at 711 Houston St. in Fort Worth, Texas, was built in 1910.  It was designed by Sanguinet & Staats with Wyatt C. Hedrick.  It has also been known as Baker Building and as Bob R. Simpson Building.

It is an 11-story three-part vertical commercial block skyscraper building.  It was designed by Fort Worth-based Sanguinet & Staats and built in 1910 with width of 3 bays upon Houston Street and 7 bays upon Seventh Street.  It was expanded to 7 bays wide on Houston in 1926, following designs of Wyatt C. Hedrick.

Its design includes elements of Beaux-Arts style, in its architectural omamentation.

See also

National Register of Historic Places listings in Tarrant County, Texas

References

External links

Architecture in Fort Worth: Bob R. Simpson Building

National Register of Historic Places in Tarrant County, Texas
Commercial buildings completed in 1910